Who You Are may refer to:

 Who You Are (Cary Brothers album), 2007
 Who You Are (Desperation Band album), 2006
 Who You Are (Jessie J album), 2011
 "Who You Are" (Jessie J song)

 "Who You Are", a song by Tally Hall from Good & Evil, 2011
"Who You Are" (Pearl Jam song), 1996
 "Who You Are", a song by Oomph! from Ego
 "Who You Are", a song by Unspoken from Get to Me EP, 2012
 "Who You Are" (Damien Leith song), a song by 22 Steps from Where We Land

See also
 Who Are You (disambiguation)